Leive, Parks and Stapp Opera House, also known as the Grand Opera House, is a historic opera house located at Aurora, Dearborn County, Indiana. It was built in 1878, and is a three-story, Italianate style brick building.  It measures 53 feet wide and 104 feet deep.  The front facade features a cast iron storefront with pilasters with Corinthian order capitals.

It was added to the National Register of Historic Places in 1994. It is located in the Downtown Aurora Historic District.

References

Theatres on the National Register of Historic Places in Indiana
Italianate architecture in Indiana
Theatres completed in 1878
Buildings and structures in Dearborn County, Indiana
National Register of Historic Places in Dearborn County, Indiana
1878 establishments in Indiana
Historic district contributing properties in Indiana
Opera houses on the National Register of Historic Places in Indiana
Opera houses in Indiana